Carlos Alfredo Lara Watson (born 28 December 1952) is a Honduran politician. He currently serves as deputy of the National Congress of Honduras representing the Liberal Party of Honduras for Choluteca.

References

1952 births
Living people
People from Choluteca Department
Deputies of the National Congress of Honduras
Liberal Party of Honduras politicians